Khandaker Sadrul Amin Habib is a Bangladesh Nationalist Party politician and a former Member of Parliament from Rajbari-2.

Career
Habib was elected to parliament from Rajbari-2 as an Bangladesh Nationalist Party candidate in 15 February 1996.

References

Bangladesh Nationalist Party politicians
Date of birth missing (living people)
6th Jatiya Sangsad members